Photinia beckii is a species in the family Rosaceae.

References 

beckii